Martin Brennan (9 August 1900 – 21 June 1956) was an Irish Fianna Fáil politician, who was elected three times to Dáil Éireann.

He was born on 9 August 1900 in the family home at Rhue, Tubbercurry, County Sligo, the sixth of thirteen children of Matthew Brennan, a farmer, and his wife Bridget Gallagher. An exceptional student, he won scholarships to both St. Nathy's College, Ballaghaderreen, and University College Galway (UCG).

He joined the Irish Volunteers in 1916 and campaigned against the introduction of conscription in summer 1918, he became captain of the UCG company of the Irish Republican Army (IRA) in 1920. Later the same year he suspended his study of medicine and returned to Sligo, where as a prominent member of the South Sligo Brigade active service unit of the IRA.

Taking the anti-Treaty side in the Irish Civil War, he was arrested in 1923 and sentenced to death, but after the intervention of the Bishop of Achonry, he was reprieved. After a forty-two-day hunger-strike he was released in July 1924 and resumed his medical studies, graduating in 1927. Between 1927 and 1932, he held a series of short-term medical posts before being appointed district medical officer for the Aclare dispensary, County Sligo in 1932.

Brennan was elected as a Fianna Fáil Teachta Dála (TD) for the Sligo constituency at the 1938 general election. He was returned at the 1943 general election, and the following year he was re-elected at the 1944 general election. He did not contest the 1948 general election. 

In January 1954 he succeeded Richard Hayes as the national film censor, and during his term of office (1954–1956) banned 9 per cent of all films submitted, as compared to 5 per cent in 1946–1953. He was the last film censor to respond to direct church intervention, when on 26 August 1954 the shot of the monstrance (bearing the blessed sacrament) was cut from Universal Newsreel.

A keen Irish language revivalist, he assisted Séamus Ó Duilearga in the collection of over 500 folklore records in the west of Ireland and Tomás Ó Máille in his research on Irish dialects and philology. His nephew Matt Brennan was a Fianna Fáil TD for Sligo–Leitrim from 1982 to 2002.

See also
Families in the Oireachtas

References

1900 births
1956 deaths
Fianna Fáil TDs
Members of the 10th Dáil
Members of the 11th Dáil
Members of the 12th Dáil
Alumni of the University of Galway